Stratton Taylor (born 1956) is an American attorney and was the longest-serving President pro tempore of the Oklahoma Senate in the U.S. state of Oklahoma. Elected as President pro tempore on a unanimous, bipartisan vote in 1995, he served eight years.

He is the founding member of the law firm Taylor, Burrage, Singhal, Mallett and Downs.

Early life and education
Taylor was born in 1956, the son of Owen and Velma Taylor. He was the only student in his 17-member Alluwe High School class to graduate from college. He began his college education at Claremore Junior College, now Rogers State University, and earned a bachelor's degree and a Juris Doctor degree from the University of Tulsa.

Political career
While finishing his bachelor's degree, Taylor was elected to the Oklahoma House of Representatives in 1979. After serving a single term, he successfully campaigned to join the Oklahoma Senate. In a unanimous, bipartisan votes, he was elected President pro tempore of the Oklahoma Senate in 1995, 1997, 1999, and 2001.

Controversy
Taylor was criticized in 2003 for writing a national letter inviting trial lawyers to practice in Oklahoma.

Personal life
Taylor is married to Carolyn Thompson Taylor, a former member of the Oklahoma House of Representatives, and resides in Claremore, Oklahoma.

Taylor helped found the law firm Taylor, Burrage, Singhal, Mallett and Downs.

See also
45th Oklahoma Legislature
46th Oklahoma Legislature
47th Oklahoma Legislature
48th Oklahoma Legislature

References

External links
Oklahoma Senate

1956 births
Living people
Democratic Party members of the Oklahoma House of Representatives
Democratic Party Oklahoma state senators
Oklahoma lawyers
University of Tulsa alumni
People from Claremore, Oklahoma
University of Tulsa College of Law alumni
21st-century American politicians